General elections were held in Tunisia in November 1964 to elect a President and Chamber of Deputies.  A year earlier, the country had been formally declared a one-party state with the Socialist Destourian Party (PSD, formerly the Neo Destour) as the sole legal party.  However, the country had effectively been a one-party state since independence in 1956.

In the presidential election, incumbent Habib Bourguiba was re-elected unopposed; as the chairman of the PSD, he was the only candidate for president. In the Chamber election, voters were presented with a single list from the PSD, which won all 90 seats. Voter turnout was 96.8%.

Results

President

Chamber of Deputies

References

Tunisia
Elections in Tunisia
1964 in Tunisia
One-party elections
Single-candidate elections
Presidential elections in Tunisia
November 1964 events in Africa